Dhibu Ninan Thomas is an Indian film music composer and producer who predominantly works in Tamil cinema. He did his bachelor of engineering in electronics from JJ Engineering College in Trichy.

Early life
Dhibu Ninan Thomas was a music enthusiast from his early childhood days, he was actively involved in music and participated in opportunities for it.

Career
Dhibu Ninan Thomas made his music director debut in 2017 with Maragadha Naanayam.
 He then composed music for the 2018 film Kanaa, which was produced by Sivakarthikeyan and directed by Arunraja Kamaraj in their maiden films as producer and director, respectively.

Discography 
As a composer

As singer
"Savaal" - Kanaa

References

External links
 

Tamil musicians
Tamil film score composers
Malayalam film score composers
Musicians from Madurai
Living people
21st-century Indian composers
Year of birth missing (living people)